John Fitzgerald and Anders Järryd were the defending champions, but Järryd did not compete this year.

Fitzgerald teamed up with Darren Cahill and lost in the final to Todd Woodbridge and Mark Woodforde. The score was 6–7, 6–4, 6–2.

Seeds

Draw

Draw

References

External links
 Official results archive (ATP)
 Official results archive (ITF)

Doubles